Hyperview may refer to:

Hyperview (computing)
Hyperview (album) by Title Fight 2015
Hyperview, design software by Altair Engineering